Charles Christopher Way  (born December 27, 1972) is an American former professional football player who was a fullback in the National Football League (NFL) for five seasons for the New York Giants.

Early life
Way was born in 1972 to Jacqueline and Cleveland Way. he graduated from Northeast High School in Philadelphia, after which he attended the University of Virginia. Way was drafted by the Giants in the sixth round of the 1995 NFL Draft, and played in five games his rookie year.  Primarily used as a fullback, blocking for Rodney Hampton, Way finished the year with 71 total yards (65 of which were receiving yards) and one touchdown, scoring in week six.

Way started 13 games his second year, again primarily used as a blocker.  He scored two touchdowns and finished the year with 79 rushing yards and 328 receiving yards.

Career
Way's breakout year was in 1997.  Given the starting halfback job after Hampton went down with an injury, Way made the most of his opportunity, rushing for 696 yards and gaining 1,001 all purpose yards, and scored five touchdowns (four rushing).  He also rushed for 114 yards against Arizona in week twelve, the only time in his career that he broke the century mark.  Way's contributions helped lead the Giants to the division championship and a home playoff game against the Minnesota Vikings, but the Giants blew a 19–3 lead and lost the game 23–22.

Way's numbers fell off slightly in 1998, but he still managed to score four touchdowns and rush for 432 yards. His career was halted by a chronic knee injury, and he announced his retirement in 2000.

Post-playing Career
Way currently works for the NFL as head of its Player Engagement Department. Prior to joining the NFL in July 2014, Way spent 14 years with the Giants as their Director of Player Development.  He lives in Wayne, New Jersey, with his wife Tahesha, the current Secretary of State of New Jersey, and a former member of the Passaic County Board of Chosen Freeholders, and their four children.

In March 2009, Way attended an annual Business Day at the prestigious business school within Bergen County Academies in Hackensack as the primary keynote speaker.

References

1972 births
Living people
People from Wayne, New Jersey
Players of American football from Philadelphia
Players of American football from New Jersey
American football running backs
New York Giants players
Virginia Cavaliers football players
Spouses of New Jersey politicians